Ambica Charan Mazumdar (1850 – 19 March 1922) was an Indian Bengali politician who served as the president of the Indian National Congress.

Early life and education
Born in Sandiya, a village in Bengal Presidency's Faridpur district (in present-day Bangladesh), Mazumdar graduated from the Scottish Church College as a graduating student of the University of Calcutta.

Career
He presided over the 1899 Bengal Provincial Conference at Burdwan as well as the 1910 Conference in Calcutta. He had served as the president of the 31st session of the Indian National Congress in 1916 where the famous Lucknow Pact was signed between the Congress and the Muslim league and also moderates and extremists of the Congress party came together once again.

Works
Indian National Evolution

References

External links

Politicians from Kolkata
Bengali Hindus
Presidents of the Indian National Congress
1850 births
1922 deaths
Scottish Church College alumni
University of Calcutta alumni
Indian National Congress politicians from West Bengal
19th-century Indian politicians
20th-century Indian politicians